Abidjan (N’ko: ߊߓߌߖߊ߲߬) is the largest city in and the economic capital of the Ivory Coast. As of the 2021 census, Abidjan's population was 6.3 million, which is 21.5 percent of overall population of the country, making it the sixth most populous city proper in Africa, after Lagos, Cairo, Kinshasa, Dar es Salaam, and Johannesburg. A cultural crossroads of West Africa, Abidjan is characterised by a high level of industrialisation and urbanisation. It also is one of the most populous French-speaking cities in Africa.

The city expanded quickly after the construction of a new wharf in 1931, followed by its designation as the capital city of the then-French colony in 1933. The completion of the Vridi Canal in 1951 enabled Abidjan to become an important sea port. Abidjan remained the capital of the Ivory Coast after its independence from France in 1960. In 1983, the city of Yamoussoukro was designated as the official political capital of Ivory Coast.

However, Abidjan has officially been designated as the "economic capital" of the country, because it is the largest city in the country and the centre of its economic activity. Many political institutions and all foreign embassies continue to be located in Abidjan as well. The Abidjan Autonomous District, which encompasses the city and some of its suburbs, is one of the 14 districts of Ivory Coast.

Etymology 
According to oral tradition of the Tchaman as reported in the Encyclopedic Dictionary of Côte d'Ivoire, the name "Abidjan" results from a misunderstanding. Legend states that an old man carrying branches to repair the roof of his house met a European explorer who asked him the name of the nearest village. The old man did not speak the language of the explorer, and thought that he was being asked to justify his presence in that place. Terrified by this unexpected meeting, he fled shouting "min-chan m'bidjan", which means in the Ébrié language: "I just cut the leaves." The explorer, thinking that his question had been answered, recorded the name of the locale as Abidjan.

A slightly different and less elaborate version of the legend: When the first colonists asked a native man the name of the place, the man misunderstood and replied "M'bi min djan": "I've just been cutting leaves".

History

Colonial era 

Abidjan was originally a small Atchan fishing village. In 1896, following a series of deadly yellow fever epidemics, French colonists who had initially settled in Grand-Bassam decided to move to a safer place and in 1898 chose the current location of Abidjan.
In 1903 it officially became a town. The settlers were followed by the colonial government, created in 1899. But then nearby Bingerville became the capital of the French colony, from 1900 until 1934.

The future Abidjan, situated on the edge of the lagoon n'doupé ("the lagoon in hot water"), offered more land and greater opportunities for trade expansion. The wharf in Petit Bassam (now Port-Bouet) south of town quickly overtook the wharf of Grand-Bassam in importance, and became the main point of economic access to the colony. In 1904, the rail terminus was located in the Port-Bouet area of Abidjan. Starting in 1904, when Bingerville was not yet complete, Abidjan became the main economic hub of the colony of Ivory Coast and a prime channel for distributing products to the European hinterland, particularly through the Lebanese community, which was increasing in importance.

 became governor of French Sudan in 1924, and remained governor until his death in 1931. One of the main streets of Abidjan still bears his name.

In 1931, Plateau and what would become Treichville were connected by a floating bridge, more or less where the Houphouët-Boigny Bridge stands today. The year 1931 also saw addresses begin to be assigned to the streets of Abidjan for the first time. The addressing project was temporarily concluded in 1964, under the leadership of Mayor Konan Kanga, then badly redone American-style in 1993.

Abidjan became the third capital of Ivory Coast by a 1934 decree, following Grand-Bassam and Bingerville. Several villages in Tchaman were then deserted. The leader of the Tchaman community can still be found in Adjame ("center" or "meeting" in Tchaman), north of the Plateau.

South of the Plateau district (the current central district of the city of Abidjan), the village of Dugbeo was moved across the lagoon to Anoumabo, "the forest of fruit bats", which became the neighborhood of Treichville (now known as Commikro, city of clerks). Treichville was renamed in 1934, in honour of Marcel Treich-Laplénie (1860–1890), the first explorer of the Ivory Coast and its first colonial administrator, considered its founder. Instead of Dugbeyo, is the current Treich-Laplénie Avenue, the bus station and water lagoon buses in Plateau, and the Avenue Charles de Gaulle (commonly called Rue du Commerce).

The city was laid out like most colonial towns, on a grid plan. Le Plateau ("m'brato" in Tchaman) were inhabited by settlers. In the north, the city was inhabited by the colonized. The two zones were separated by the Gallieni Military Barracks, where now there is the current courthouse.

Near the port, originally named Boulevard de Marseille, settlers became defensive and stole a street sign of a famous street of Marseille renamed the street Canebière, a sand track. This is the legend behind the first Blohorn oil mills, in Cocody and a racetrack was built in the south of the city.

In Le Plateau in the 1940s, the Bardon Park Hotel was built, the first air-conditioned hotel working in francophone Africa.

Abidjan's lagoon became connected to the sea once the 15m-deep  canal was completed in 1950. Soon Abidjan became the financial center of West Africa. In 1958, the first bridge to connect Petit-Bassam Island with the mainland was completed.

After independence 
When Côte d’Ivoire became independent in 1960, Abidjan became the new country's administrative and economic center. The axis south of Treichville, towards the international airport and the beaches, became the heart of European and middle-class Abidjan. The city saw considerable population growth in the decades following independence, expanding from 180,000 inhabitants in 1960 to 1,269,000 in 1978. Abidjan's skyline dates back to the economic prosperity of this period.

New districts such as the upmarket Cocody were founded during this period; built to a large extent in a colonial style, Cocody has since become home to Côte d’Ivoire's wealthy classes as well as expatriates and foreign diplomats. The district is home to the embassy of France, Hotel Ivoire (which for a long time, was the only African hotel to have a skating rink), and, since 2009, the largest U.S. embassy in West Africa.

Construction on St. Paul's Cathedral, designed by Italian architect Aldo Spirito, began with the 1980 groundbreaking by Pope John Paul II and was completed in 1985. From the 1980s, Abidjan's fortunes declined as a result of negligence on the part of officials as well as corruption and general degradation. In 1983, the village of Yamoussoukro became the new political capital of Ivory Coast under the leadership of President Félix Houphouët-Boigny, who was born in Yamoussoukro.

From 2002 to 2007 and especially from 2010 to 2011, Abidjan suffered from the consequences of the First and Second Ivorian Civil Wars. In November 2004, armed conflict broke out between French forces and Ivorian forces loyal to Laurent Gbagbo after the Ivorian Air Force attacked French peacekeepers in northern Côte d’Ivoire. After France destroyed Côte d’Ivoire's air capabilities in retaliation, pro-Gbagbo groups staged riots and looting in Abidjan and targeted French homes, schools, and businesses. French peacekeepers moved into the city to calm the situation. Other crises during the first civil war period include the case of the Probo Koala in 2006, in which disposed products caused thousands of residents to seek medical attention. Côte d’Ivoire's civil conflicts seriously impacted the security situation in Abidjan. Amidst the anti-French riots in November 2004, 4,000 prisoners in Abidjan escaped from the country's largest prison.

Abidjan was one of the main theaters of the 2010–2011 Ivorian crisis and the site of major demonstrations against incumbent president Gbagbo, including one on International Women's Day in 2011 that saw several demonstrators killed by Gbagbo's forces. The end of the crisis came with Gbagbo's capture in Abidjan in April 2011, following a major offensive by forces loyal to election winner Alassane Ouattara with support from France and the UN.

Geography 

Abidjan lies on the south-east coast of the country, on the Gulf of Guinea. The city is located on the Ébrié Lagoon. The business district, Le Plateau, is the center of the city, along with Cocody, Deux Plateaux (the city's wealthiest neighborhood and a hub for diplomats), and Adjamé, a slum on the north shore of the lagoon. Treichville and Marcory lie to the south, Attecoube, Locodjro, Abobo Doume and Yopougon to the west, and Île Boulay is located in the middle of the lagoon. Further south lies Port Bouët, home to the airport and main seaport. Abidjan is located at 5°25' North, 4°2' West (5.41667, –4.03333).

Climate 
Abidjan experiences a tropical wet and dry climate, according to the Köppen climate classification (Köppen climate classification: Aw). Abidjan has nonconsecutive rainy seasons (precipitation above  with a long rainy season from March to July and a short rainy season from September to December, and three dry months (January, February and August). Precipitation is abundant during the summer months, except for August, due to activation of the Benguela Current, which reduces the precipitation total throughout the month. The Benguela Current also lowers the mean temperature during August, making it the coolest month of the year, averaging . Abidjan has two additional dry months (January and February). Abidjan is generally humid, with average relative humidity above 80% throughout the year.

Climate change 
A 2019 paper published in PLOS One estimates that under Representative Concentration Pathway 4.5, a "moderate" scenario of climate change where global warming reaches ~ by 2100, the climate of Abidjan in the year 2050 would most closely resemble the current climate of Manila in the Philippines.

Moreover, according to the 2022 IPCC Sixth Assessment Report, Abidjan is one of 12 major African cities (Abidjan, Alexandria, Algiers, Cape Town, Casablanca, Dakar, Dar es Salaam, Durban, Lagos, Lomé, Luanda and Maputo) which would be the most severely affected by the future sea level rise. It estimates that they would collectively sustain cumulative damages of USD 65 billion under RCP 4.5 and USD 86.5 billion for the high-emission scenario RCP 8.5 by the year 2050. Additionally, RCP 8.5 combined with the hypothetical impact from marine ice sheet instability at high levels of warming would involve up to 137.5 billion USD in damages, while the additional accounting for the "low-probability, high-damage events" may increase aggregate risks to USD 187 billion for the "moderate" RCP4.5, USD 206 billion for RCP8.5 and USD 397 billion under the high-end ice sheet instability scenario. Since sea level rise would continue for about 10,000 years under every scenario of climate change, future costs of sea level rise would only increase, especially without adaptation measures.

Territorial divisions 
The Autonomous District of Abidjan (District Autonome d'Abidjan), which superseded the former City of Abidjan (Ville d'Abidjan) in 2001, is made up of 10 central communes, whose territory corresponds to the former City of Abidjan, and 4 outlying sub-prefectures: Anyama, Bingerville, Brofodoumé, and Songon.

The 10 communes of the former City of Abidjan are traditionally divided into northern Abidjan and southern Abidjan, with the Ébrié Lagoon separating both halves of the city.

Communes of Northern Abidjan 

Abobo consists mainly of public housing. Abobo has a large population of low-income migrants. This area has developed spontaneously.
Adjamé developed from the village of Ébrié, which existed before Abidjan developed. Although polluted and small in size, this commune is commercially very important for the Ivorian economy. It contains a varied shopping district and its bus station is the Côte d'Ivoire's main hub for international bus lines.
Yopougon is the most populous commune of Abidjan, lying partly in Northern Abidjan and partly across the lagoon in Southern Abidjan. It is home to both industrial and residential areas. The research station ORSTOM, the Pasteur Institute, and a training hospital are located in this commune.
Plateau is Ivory Coast's business center, with very modern, tall buildings. Although the governmental and administrative capital of Côte d'Ivoire officially transferred to Yamoussoukro in 1983, the institutions of the republic such as the Presidency and National Assembly are still located in Plateau. It is the main administrative, commercial and financial center of Ivory Coast.
Attécoubé contains Banco forest, classified as a national park.
Cocody is famous for its residential districts, Deux-Plateaux and Riviera. The Université Félix Houphouët-Boigny, a public institution, and some private universities are also located within the commune. Radio Television Ivoirienne (RTI) is located in Cocody. The President of the Republic also resides in this commune, which contains the embassy district.

Communes of Southern Abidjan 

Koumassi: This commune has an important industrial area.
Marcory: This commune is mainly residential, and contains the upscale  and Zone 4 neighborhoods where many foreigners live.
Port-Bouët: This commune includes the (SIR refinery and the Félix Houphouët-Boigny International airport. There is also an established office of the IRD, the centre of Little Bassam. The famous lighthouse sweeps the Gulf of Guinea for several nautical miles out. The Vridi beach area is busy every weekend although the ocean is very rough; this phenomenon widely holds all along the Gulf of Guinea. From 1950 on, Vridi has been the primary employment hub in Abidjan because of its increasing number of factories and warehouses.
Treichville: This commune is home to the Autonomous Port of Abidjan and to many stores. The port area is also industrial. There is also the Treichville state swimming pool (PET), the Treichville sports palace, the Palace of Culture, and the Abidjan racetrack.
 Île Boulay.

Suburbs 
Towns near Abidjan include Jacqueville, Grand-Lahou and Dabou in the west; Sikensi, Tiassalé, Agboville, Adzopé and Alépé in the north; and Grand-Bassam to the east.

The towns (or sub-prefectures) of Anyama, Bingerville, Brofodoumé and Songon are within the Abidjan Department, which is co-extensive with the autonomous district.

Politics

Administration

Organisation 
Formerly managed by the French colonial administration, Abidjan became a municipality (commune) in 1956, divided into administrative areas by lagoons. Its first municipal council was elected on 18 November 1956, and the first mayor in the context of the Loi-Cadre of 1956 was president Félix Houphouët-Boigny.

In 1980, the municipality of Abidjan (commune d'Abidjan) was transformed into the City of Abidjan (Ville d'Abidjan), and its territory was divided in 10 communes. A city council and mayor of the City of Abidjan elected by the population oversaw the entire city, whereas 10 municipal councils also elected by the population managed each commune. Dioulo Emmanuel was elected mayor of the City of Abidjan on 30 November 1980.

In 2001, the City of Abidjan was disbanded and replaced by a larger Autonomous  District of Abidjan. The autonomous district overlaps the Abidjan Department, which was established in 1969 and has had its current boundaries since 1998. The district is made up of the 10 communes of the former City of Abidjan, and of 4 outlying sub-prefectures: Anyama, Bingerville, Brofodoumé, and Songon. Since the 2000s, the built-up area of Abidjan has largely expanded into these 4 formerly rural sub-prefectures.

As a result of the creation of the Autonomous District of Abidjan in 2001, the post of Mayor of City of Abidjan was replaced by that of District Governor, appointed by the head of state. The position has been occupied by Robert Beugré Mambé since 2011. The District Governor manages Abidjan along with an assembly, the Autonomous District Council (Conseil du District Autonome), one-third of whose members are appointed by the government of Côte d'Ivoire, and two-third are representatives from the municipal councils of the communes making up the district. Each of the ten communes of Abidjan has its own municipal council, headed by a mayor. The last municipal elections were held in 2018. The sub-prefectures of the autonomous district also have their own mayors and councils.

The communes of Abobo, Adjamé, Attécoubé, Cocody, and Plateau are located north of the Ébrié Lagoon (hence the name "Abidjan North"). This is the continental part of Abidjan.
The commune of Yopougon straddles the lagoon, with part lying north and part south of that body of water. The communes of Treichville, Koumassi, Marcory, and Port-Bouet in Abidjan are south of the lagoon. Blokosso and Locodjro villages are included within the city and maintain cultural identity in urban areas.

Education 

The Université Félix Houphouët-Boigny was founded in 1964.

In Côte d'Ivoire, the enrollment rate is 74% and access to secondary education is limited by an entrance assessment at the 6th stage after which one-third of students are allowed to continue their studies. 24% of the student population resides in Abidjan, which comprises 20% of the total population. Abidjan is the location of the main educational institutions in the Côte d'Ivoire. These include the Lycée Classique d'Abidjan, the Lycée Sainte-Marie de Cocody, Lycée garçon de Bingerville, Mami Adjoua the Lyceum, the Blaise Pascal Abidjan school is a French school – a school who has signed an agreement with the ADFE. Recently the Lycée International Jean-Mermoz re-opened which was initially called College International Jean-Mermoz, founded by Pierre Padovani. The Institution suffered from a devastating war and was forced to close.

Government institutions 

The majority of Ivorian government institutions are still located in Abidjan and have not been transferred to the political capital, Yamoussoukro. The President's office is in Cocody, and the parliament, the Constitutional Council, the Supreme Court, and the Chancellery of the National Order are all in Le Plateau. Under the presidency of Laurent Gbagbo (2000–11), efforts were made to give effect to the project of making the political capital Yamoussoukro in Côte d'Ivoire. This goal continues to be the consensus of the country's political leaders.

Government offices are located in Le Plateau in the administrative district of Abidjan, Boulevard Carde or Angoulvant Boulevard (near the Cathedral of St. Paul of Abidjan), or elsewhere in the great buildings of the town.

Security 
The instability of the 2002–2007 civil war and 2010–2011 crisis saw foreign peacekeeping forces stationed in Abidjan. The United Nations Operation in Côte d’Ivoire (UNOCI), established in April 2004, has its headquarters at the former Hotel Sebroko in Attécoubé. While the size of the force has been reduced since the end of the 2011 crisis, UNOCI's mandate was extended in 2013 and again in 2015. The force remains authorized to maintain up to 5,245 troops, 192 observers, 1,500 police and eight customs officers in the country.

France's peacekeeping operations in Côte d’Ivoire continued under the aegis of Operation Unicorn until 2015 and then as the French forces in Côte d’Ivoire from 2015 onward. In 2014, French defense minister Jean-Yves Le Drian announced that Abidjan would be reinforced as the entry point for France's military presence and counterterrorism operations in the Sahel region. After al-Qaeda militants targeted beachgoers at Grand Bassam in March 2016, the French government announced it would increase its troop deployment in Côte d’Ivoire from 500 to 900. French soldiers are based in Port-Bouet as well as at the Abidjan airport.

In 2007, Pierre Laba's comedy film Permanent Danger explored the laxity of the police against banditry in major African cities, specifically in Abidjan.

Police 
Abidjan is divided into districts, each of which has a police station. The municipal police and national police are separate.

All police are trained at the National Police Academy in the town of Cocody. They are recruited by competitive examination held by the police administration. The police include several sections, such as the BAE (Anti Riot Squad), whose base is located in Yopougon north of the city, the CRS (Republican Security Company), whose main base is located in Williamsville (Adjame) and also includes a secondary base called CRS2, which is located in zone 4 in the town of Marcory in the central capital. The Force and CECOS accompany the police.

The main base of the gendarmerie is at Agban (commonly Adjamé). There are others in Abobo and Kumasi, It also has a training school in Cocody and the city.

Drugs 
Since 2000, Côte d'Ivoire has experienced a sharp rise in drug trafficking. Drug dens arise mainly in informal settlements and there has been a recent spike in demand among unemployed youth and Ivorian vagrants. The Ivorian police increasingly focus on the fight against trafficking and drug use in the district of Abidjan. A report by the Office of the UN says West Africa plays an increasingly important role in the transit of cocaine to Latin America and Europe. In May 2007, seven drug houses were dismantled and 191 people arrested including a military officer.

French military base 
Abidjan is home to Port-Bouet, one of the six French military bases that still exist in Africa (Dakar, Libreville, Bouar CAR, N'Djamena and Djibouti). Thousands of people live there, around the 43rd BIMA which is permanently in place in accordance with established defense agreements on 24 April 1961 linking the two countries.

Relationships and partnerships

Diplomacy and international bodies 
Abidjan is the regional headquarters of major international institutions, including UNICEF, UN Development Program, World Health Organization, World Food Program, UNOPS, UNFPA, International Labour Organization (ILO), International Monetary Fund (IMF), and IFAD. Diplomatic missions in Ivory Coast are mostly located in Abidjan.

The African Development Bank (ADB), the largest financial institution in Africa, is headquartered in Abidjan.

Twin towns – Sister cities 
Abidjan is sisters with:

  Tianjin, China
  Marseille, France
  São Paulo, Brazil
  San Francisco, US
  Alfortville, France (twinned with Cocody)
  Kumasi, Ghana (twinned with Treichville)
  Pontault-Combault, France (twinned with Anyama)
  Boulogne-Billancourt, France
  Yokohama, Japan

Society 
The 2021 census recorded Abidjan's population as 6,321,017. As Abidjan is inhabited by people from a wide array of different ethnicities, French is commonly spoken in the metropolitan area, which is the third largest French speaking metropolitan area in the world after Kinshasa and Paris. Colloquial Abidjan French has even appeared, which has a different pronunciation and some slang words different from standard French. Abidjan is recognized as one of the few areas in Africa where French (colloquial Abidjan French) is truly a native tongue, along with Libreville, Gabon.

Demographics 
The District of Abidjan's population was 6,321,017 at the December 14, 2021 census, up from 4,707,404 at the May 15, 2014 census.

Population increase, lower in the 2000s due to the economic crisis and Ivorian Civil War, has picked up in the 2010s to levels unseen since the 1980s thanks to the rapid economic growth experienced by Abidjan after the return of peace in 2012. Many inhabitants come to live in Abidjan for employment and better standards of living.

By 1950, Abidjan had just exceeded a population of 50,000 (at the end of 1948). Reaching a population of a million by the end of 1975, the city grew at a rate of 10 to 12% per year, doubling every six or seven years. However, this growth underwent a sharp decline due to the crises of the 1980s and 1990s. In the last 20 years of the 20th century, the growth rate dropped to 3–6%. Birth rate growth was supplemented by migration, with the influx being substantial and the outflow only partly offseting the arrivals. The migration, prior to the census of 1988, contributed a growth of about 80,000 with 50,000 people from within Côte d'Ivoire, and about 30,000 from abroad per year.

From within Côte d'Ivoire, the migration pattern was dominated by Akan (South-east, 48%), then Mandé (North-west, 24%) and Krou (South-west, 20%). From abroad, the migration was Burkinabes (30%), Malians (22%), Ghanaians (19%), Nigerien (11%), and Guineans (9%). Of the non-African migration, Lebanese migration was highest, followed by European migration, with the French being largest of this latter group. All in all, people of non-African origin represent 3% of the total population of Abidjan, which remains the highest in the region.

Languages 
The traditional language of the city was Ebrié. Since independence, the official language in Abidjan and throughout Côte d'Ivoire has been French. While the official language is a formal variety of standard French similar to that of Paris, the most commonly spoken form of French in Abidjan is a colloquial dialect known as français de Treichville or français de Moussa which differs from standard French in pronunciation and in some of its vocabulary. Another form of spoken French in Abidjan is Nouchi, a highly informal variety used as adolescent slang. The historical lingua franca, still spoken and understood by most of the trading population of Abidjan, is Dioula. The city hosts many Ivorians from all over the country and about sixty vernacular languages are spoken, such as Attié, Baoulé, Bété, and Wobé. Abidjan is surrounded by more than thirty villages where Baoulé and Ébrié are still commonly spoken.

Health 
Some traditional medicine establishments sell traditional drugs in the street. There are numerous health centers, pharmacies and pharmacopoeias. The city has more than fifty clinics, and over sixty specialist locations (veterinary, dermatology, dental, optometry, motherhood, psychology, pediatrics, etc.).

Urbanism and habitat 
Modern districts like Plateau or Cocody have developed similar to those in Europe with the construction of large office towers and apartment buildings between the 1970s and the mid-1980s. The CCIA building (Abidjan International Trade Center Building), a skyscraper, was completed in 1982.

Traditional neighborhoods like Treichville or Marcory maintained the system of "concessions" where housing is adjacent to the plant and an area of several houses, within the normal organization and multi centuries-old African villages.

The district of Cocody is also home to many single-storey wooden villas, surrounded by vast gardens of lush vegetation, fed by the heavy rains that water the city. Wealthier inhabitants constructed villas in imitation of Greek temples in this district. In addition, many houses were built on stilts on the edge of the Ébrié Lagoon. The town hall, a fine example of modernist architecture, was designed by architect .

Problems with urban network 

The urban network is disrupted, as Abidjan has seen its population double every seven years since 1945. Rural people are attracted by the opportunities of the city. Abidjan represents 45% of city dwellers in the Côte d'Ivoire and 20% of the overall population. The city is by far the country's largest, dwarfing the second-largest city, Bouaké (which had 542,082 inhabitants in 2014) as well as the political capital, Yamoussoukro (207,412 inhabitants).

Urban squalor 

Since the 2006 Probo Koala toxic waste dumping incident, significant efforts have been made to address waste management issues in Abidjan. In 2006, a contract was signed between China and Côte d'Ivoire: a Chinese company handling urban waste and industrial plans to treat all waste district this transformation also create daily cleaning.

French nongovernmental organisation ACTED rolled out a three-part project across three districts of Abidjan in 2016, establishing street cleaning, waste collection and hygiene training. ACTED spokesperson Jérémy Lescot described the project as "a fine success".

Urban rehabilitation 
The last transportation upgrade in Abidjan led to the repaving of certain roads in the capital in 1994. Since May 2007, the company  (Road Management Agency) is undertaking major operations in Abidjan and Anyama relating to badly damaged roads, suffering from lack of maintenance, heavy rain and protests. It is also addressing the gutters and unpaved roads. The District and BNETD plan to rehabilitate and construct , providing them with a quality to last 15–20 years of life. Improvements include the rehabilitation of roads in Abidjan and Anyama, construction of drains, the tarring of gravel roads and sanitation of the city by the construction of sewers. These rehabilitations affect all municipalities in Abidjan:

 In Cocody, at a cost of 3 billion CFA franc, reconstruction of the Corniche, one of the busiest roads in the municipality. Reconstruction has been extended by the dam of the limit, located at the Carrefour de la vie, to filter all waste dumped into the lagoon.
 In Abobo the degradation of the roads requires a significant investment in manufacturing and installation of gutters to ensure proper sanitation. The rehabilitation of roads and highways continues.

Notable people 

Arnaud Monney (born 1981), football player
Anderson Lago Zeze (born 1989), football player
Kader Kohou (born November 28, 1998), American football player

Economy 

The principal stock exchange of the Côte d'Ivoire and the other seven countries of the Union Économique et Monétaire Ouest Africaine (UEMOA), Bourse Régionale des Valeurs Mobilières (BRVM), is located in Abidjan. Air Ivoire has its head office in Abidjan. Prior to its dissolution, Air Afrique was headquartered in Abidjan.

Industry 
The region near the lagoons is the most industrialized region of the country.

Major industries include food processing, lumber, automobile manufacturing, textiles, chemicals, and soap. There is also a large oil refinery. Its industries are mainly in construction and maintenance with the presence of major international groups: the furnace SETAO, Colas, Bouygues, Jean Lefebvre, and Swiss Holcim.

There are textile industries with the packaging of cotton in the north both for export or for on-site processing of cloth, canvas, batik clothing and miscellaneous. The textile sector is very dynamic, and represents 15.6% of net investment, 13% of turnover and 24% of the value added in Ivorian industry.

There are several offshore oil wells in operation (Côte d'Ivoire is an oil producing country), which leads to the presence of a chemical industry with oil refineries, and an oil port. It also works on stones and precious metals for exportation

The city also has a large wood processing plant at the port by river from the forests of central Canada. It exports natural mahogany, peeled wood, plywood and chipboard for the past two centuries.

Food industry mainly include: the production of palm oil, bergamot and Seville oranges. In the west, rubber is processed as well as manufacturing beverages from pineapples, oranges and mangoes, producing robusta coffee: Côte d'Ivoire is the third largest producer, behind Colombia and Brazil and processing cocoa, it is the largest producer in the world ahead of Ghana and Indonesia. (37% of cocoa and 10% of coffee products undergo at least one first local processing). Abidjan is also the first African tuna port for the European market. This generated 3,000 salaried jobs and is an important source of foreign exchange. As in all countries of the Third World developing countries, much of the city's economy lies in what economists describe as informal economy with its many "odd jobs".

Tertiary sector 
The development of tertiary industry, with the establishment of international commercial banks and the increasing number of service companies of all types, appears to be the trend of recent years. Abidjan is the main financial center of French West Africa. The seat of the common stock exchange of West Africa (BRVM) is located in Abidjan. BRVM is mainly dominated by Ivorian firms.

Electricity 
The thermal power plant Azito, built in 1997 in partnership with EDF, located on the Yopougon on the edge of the lagoon and facing Ébrié Island Boulay, alone provides 300 MW. Two other power plants, built in 1984 and 1985, are installed in Vridi. Several utilities are installed in Abidjan: CI Energies, formerly SOPIE, which is a corporation state, ICE and CIPREL, subsidiaries of the French group SAUR Côte d'Ivoire produces all the electricity it consumes, and exports to neighboring countries, Ghana, Togo, Benin, Mali and Burkina Faso through the interconnection.

The production, which increases steadily, and gas storage are provided by two state companies: PETROCI and GESTOCI. A small industry of renewable energy production has also developed.

Telecommunication and ICT 
The city has a powerful fixed telephone network of 450,000 lines (in 2004) managed by Côte d'Ivoire Telecom. Broadband Internet connections, leased lines and ADSL are powered by various providers: Aviso Ivory Coast Telecoms. Africa is Line, Globe Access, Afnet,.

Banking system 
Abidjan is home to all the representatives of international financial institutions: World Bank, International Monetary Fund, African Development Bank, BOAD, etc. Banking Commission of WAEMU regional stock exchange securities subsidiaries of major international banks: BNP Paribas, General bank, Crédit Lyonnais, Citibank, JPMorgan Chase & Co., Barclays, etc. Sixteen national banks (SGBCI, BICI, etc.) maintaining a network of 170 branches, seven financial institutions and more than thirty insurance companies make a financial competitive Abidjan that animates the entire West Africa.

Transportation 
Trains on the line to Ouagadougou run from several stations in the city, the most important being in Treichville. Ferries link Treichville, Abobo-Doumé and Le Plateau. Felix Houphouet Boigny International Airport serves the city. Work on a new metro system has begun, with the beginning of service anticipated in 2020.

SOTRA (Abidjan Transport Company) ensure urban transportation in Abidjan via bus, taxi and luggage Line Express.

Sotra has announced the start of work for the use of light rail to Abidjan. The project has three phases at a cost of 125 billion CFA francs for a long loop of 32 km.

Taxis 
There are two kinds: the taxi-meter (Red), which can travel throughout the city, and woro-woro (yellow and green, blue or orange depending on the commune), which are limited to a neighborhood.

Airport 
Port Bouet Airport has a large capacity that allows it to accommodate all existing large aircraft. Abidjan is located an hour's flight from all the capitals of the sub-region. Abidjan is served by major airlines in the direction of the great capitals of the world. Headquarters of the former multinational African Air company, Abidjan airport had nearly 2,070,000 passengers in 2017.

Circulation 
The District has several paved streets and boulevards linking the towns between them and the District across the country. Abidjan has a network of urban bypasses.

River transport is already consistent with fishing spots and many "boat-buses" connecting the various neighborhoods of the city thrives plan lagoon.

Abidjan is also the bridgehead of the country's only highway linking the city to the administrative and political capital, Yamoussoukro.

Port 

Abidjan has one of the biggest ports in the sub-region (West Africa). It is a container transshipment port and was opened in 1951 in the presence of the Minister of Overseas and Colonies at the time, François Mitterrand. The 15 m deep Vridi Canal, where boats with large draughts can dock in the deep-water port.

The Côte d'Ivoire is in the Franc Zone (where the currency is CFA francs), as part of the West African Economic and Monetary Union (WAEMU). Abidjan is the economic centre of both the Côte d'Ivoire and of the whole region, including Burkina Faso and Mali; this is mainly because of its deep-water port. The road network in Abidjan (5,600 km asphalted in 1995, compared to 1,000 km in 1970), which covers the whole region, effectively increases its port activity as 50% of the business from Burkina Faso, Mali and Niger pass through it.

Abidjan receives the bulk of the country's industrial activity; its port alone receiving 60% of ivory park industry. Abidjan has ambitions of oil-production—off-shore production and especially refining and distribution. In 1995 the port received 12 million tonnes of traffic, of which 5.5 million tonnes were petroleum products.

Exports include coffee, cocoa, timber, bananas, pineapples, and manganese.

Bridges 
The two-halves of the city, Northern Abidjan and Southern Abidjan, are joined by the Houphouët-Boigny, the Charles de Gaulle and the Henri Konan Bédié bridges. The two former bridges, built in the 1950s and 1960s respectively, are located between Treichville and Le Plateau. The Général-de-Gaulle Bridge extends over the immense Valéry Giscard d'Estaing Boulevard which leads to the airport. Both bridges are often congested, especially during rush hour or on the occasion of police and military roadblocks.

A third  toll bridge and expressway, the Henri Konan Bédié Bridge between Cocody and Marcory was completed in December 2014. Project construction began in the second half of 2012 and required the relocation of several homes and businesses opposite the Mille Maquis (the noted restaurant la Bâche bleue was moved). According to data reported by the African Development Bank, 2,499 persons were impacted by the bridge construction and were relocated and compensated.

A fourth  toll bridge is currently under construction between Yopougon and Plateau.

Trains and trams 

The city is the foothold for the region's only railway: the Abidjan-Ouagadougou line, with stations in Treichville, Abobo and Adjamé. This line only has two trains, the Gazelle and the Bélier, and links the two capitals in about 40 hours.

The most recent project in Abidjan is the Abidjan Metro which is promised by the Ivory Society of Railroads (SICF).

The development of infrastructural projects has been envisaged, including a suburban train system in Abidjan which is estimated to cost almost 100 billion CFA francs. This suburban train system would link the North-West to the East and North of the city. The infrastructural works (tracks, electrification, and civil engineers) have been estimated at 40 billion CFA francs, financed by the State of Ivory Coast and backers (World Bank and the French Development Agency). In addition, a BOT concession contract would be given to a private operator, over 20–30 years, to operate the network. This operator will be in charge of the acquisition of railway materials, workshop renovation and the implementation of an organisational system. The concession contract has been estimated at around 60 billion CFA francs.

Tourism 

Abidjan is a unique city in Africa. Its nicknames, such as "Manhattan of the tropics", "Small Manhattan" or "Pearl of the lagoons", explain the city's unpredictable and triumphant image. With its accommodation facilities – such as the Golf Hôtel – and sporting facilities, its lively night life, transport and communication lines as well as its impressiveness, it is the perfect city for business tourism.

Abidjan also has beaches around the lagoon, with palm and coconut trees, in the Vridi area, which are very popular at weekends with the picturesque sight of the pineapple and coconut sellers. Nevertheless, the rip-tides which affects practically the whole of the Gulf of Guinea's coast, means that in this area swimming is not usually allowed. Generally, in Cote d'Ivoire, tourism has never really been developed as an economic industry; the country is not much of a common holiday destination.

Parc du Banco (Banco National Park) 

Converted in 1926, this park has 3,000 hectares and ancient "sacred wood" lies at the entrance to the city, in the Attécoubé community, which has been conserved as a relic of the first forest which surrounded the lagoon in the past. A tarmaced road goes straight to the lake at the heart of the park and trails go throughout it. The park is inhabited and there are coffee and cocoa plantations.

At the edge of the park, a small river serves as a wash-house where the fanicos, laundry men, work after collecting the laundry from the whole of the city. It is one of the 'small jobs' which exist in Abidjan.

Nightlife 
Overall, the nightlife in Abidjan is considered to be one of the liveliest in the whole of Africa.

The district has an abundance of night-clubs, maquis, out-door areas, and go-go bars. These entertainment platforms provide a musical 'pipeline' encompassing mainly DJs, Coupé Décalé and Zouglou, and, in lesser amounts, other local and international varieties.

Formerly containing only local traditional varieties, Congolese music and Western music, Abidjan's night life has experienced a positive cultural disruption in its music since the start of the 2000s, with the arrival of Coupé Décalé.

It has given a globally identifiable cultural identity to entertainment 'made in Côte d'Ivoire'.

The very popular Zouglou additionally benefits "Wôyô" spaces; furnished and dedicated so that the most famous, the Internat at Fitini's and the Lycee at Vieux Gazeur's, attract 'zouglouphiles' the whole weekend.

Treichville, with its many maquis, discothèques, and jazz clubs, used to be the liveliest area in the city, but since the end of the 1990s Youpougon, Marcory, and Cocody have taken over this role.

Culture

Monuments and museums 
 The National Library of Côte d'Ivoire
 In Cocody:
 The Goethe Institute.
 The Municipal Museum.
 The American Culture Centre (CCA)
 The Ki Yi M'Bock Village (in the Riviera).
 Cocody Museum of Contemporary Art.
 Point d'Orgue, private music education centre
 In Plateau:
 The French Cultural Centre (CCF)
 The Côte d'Ivoire Museum of Civilisations: presents a collection of Ivorian art (statues, masks, jewelry, tools, carved doors, tom-toms and musical instruments from every region in the country).
 In Treichville:
 The Sports Palace
 The Cultural Palace.
 The Abidjan artisanal centre (CAVA)

Cinema

Festivals 
Each year film festivals are organised in Abidjan: The Clap-Ivoire Festival, the Spanish Film Festival, the Côte d'Ivoire National Film Festival (FESNACI) – the first of which was organised in 2007, the short film festival (FIMA), which has been organised since 1998 by Hanni Tchelley, the Abidjan Israeli Film Festival; the fourth one took place in 2006 in the Goethe Institute.

Abidjan in cinema 
Several films depict or are devoted to the city:

 Moi, un noir (1958) by Jean Rouch
 Le Sixième doigt, a film by Henri Duparc.
 Bronx-Barbès by Eliane Delatour released in 2000.
  Mentir Pour Être Parfait by Abraham Arts Entertainment
 Enfer De La Justice by Abraham Arts Entertainment
 Caramel a film by Henri Duparc with Adrienne Koutouan, Fortuné Akakpo.
 Danger Permanent a film by Pierre Laba with Michel Bohiri, Michel Gohou, Adrienne Koutouan, Jimmy Danger.
 Un homme pour deux sœurs a film by Marie-Louise Asseu released in 2007, with Bétika, Jimmy Danger, Michel Gohou
 Man from Cocody a film by Christian-Jaque released in 1964, with Jean Marais, Philippe Clay, Robert Dalban, Jacques Morel, Gil Delamare, Maria Grazia Buccela, Nancy Holloway and Liselotte Pulver.
 , a film by Bleu Brigitte released in December 2007, with Fortuné Akakpo, Fanta Coulibaly, Tatianna de M'C Ensira.

Music 
Abidjan is a turntable for West African music, and a major producer of musical art in Africa. The city attracts the majority of musicians from the Côte d'Ivoire mainly because of its many dance clubs, which allow artists to make their debut and express themselves, record companies and national media. Here are a few examples of the most popular artists to have made their debut in Abidjan: Alpha Blondy, Aïcha Koné, the group Magic System, Meiway, and Tiken Jah Fakoly, as well as Gadji Celi, Chantal Taiba, Nayanka Bell, DJ Arafat. In the 1980s, South African musician Miriam Makeba relocated to Abidjan when she was not allowed back into the country, as did the Congolese singer Tshala Muana.

Since the 1990s, Abidjan has had a significant variety of musical styles being exported throughout Africa and the West. These are Zoblazo, Mapouka, Zouglou and, since 2002, the Coupé-Décalé; the popularity and great variety of these dances make the city a kind of African dance and musical trend capital. The Democratic Republic of the Congo formerly held this title, with rumba, soukous and then ndombolo. Abidjan is also considered the reggae capital of Africa.

Each year, the city organises the following music festivals:

 Abi-Reggae
 Faya Flow
 Les Top d'or.
 Concerto Festival.
 Le Tiercé Gagnant
 The RTI Music Awards.
 Dj Mix Atalakou, organised by RTI Music TV
 International Jazz Festival of Abidjan (FIJA)
 International Festival of Black Music (FIMNA). Organised every two years, alternating with the International Jazz Festival.

Media 

Most mass media in Côte d'Ivoire can be found in Abidjan.

Television and radio 
The National Council for Audio-visual Communication (CNCA) is the regulating authority of audio-visual material in Côte d'Ivoire.

Radiodiffusion Television Ivoirienne (RTI) is the radio and television broadcasting authority for Côte d'Ivoire; it is financed by licence fees, publicity and grants. RTI has four television channels and two radio stations: La Première (non-specialised), TV2, RTI Music TV, RTI Sport TV, Radio Côte d'Ivoire, and Fréquence 2 (non-specialised radio). Radio Jam is a private radio station in Côte d'Ivoire and is most listened to by young people.

With regards to private channels, Tam-Tam TV will be the first International Côte d'Ivoire television channel with headquarters in Abidjan, with other studios in the United States, Italy, France, Asia, the Middle East.

There are also several Côte d'Ivoire TV channels or radio stations available on the Internet: Africahit, Music TV, Abidjan.net TV, Bengueshow, etc.

With the launch in 2015 of DISCOP Africa Abidjan, the city became a hub for TV market professionals from French-speaking Africa.

Press 
At the time of the single-party, a political situation which ruled over the country for 30 years like most other West African countries after independence, only one daily newspaper was distributed throughout the country: Fraternité Matin, from the parliamentary group PDCI-RDA, which was founded by the first president, Félix Houphouët-Boigny. The advent of multiple parties in Côte d'Ivoiret in 1999 can be seen in the proliferation of newspapers and diverse publications, of which the majority is published in Abidjan.

Daily Publications
 
 
 Fraternité Matin
 Mo" Papers.
 Mo" Entertainment
 Le nouveau réveil
 Notre Voie
 
 
 Le Temps
 Le Jour
 Le Patriote
 Le Matin d'Abidjan
 Le Courrier d'Abidjan
 
 Soir Info
 24 heures
Daily Sports Publications
 Douze
 Le Sport
Weekly Publications
 Gbich (journal satirique)
 La Nouvelle République
 Le Démocrate
 Top Visage
Monthly Publications
 Déclic Magazine*
 Babi Mams Magazine
 Amina

Internet and digital TV 
The President, the Prime Minister, the government, and ministers have an official website.

 The web portal Abidjan.net, which is domiciled in California in the U.S., broadcasts information about the city and the country all over the world. In the "global village" organisation, Abidjan has a number of internet-cafés which are increasing exponentially, in 2007, there were 400,000 Internet users.
 The web portal Abidjan24.net, which is domiciled in Abidjan in the Ivory Coast, broadcasts information about the city and the country all over the world.

Television channels 
 There is only one public state-owned channel (RTI), which is also in charge of radio.
 Channel 2 (TV2): in progress.
 Private channels and international radio: undeveloped, non-existent.
 Local radio stations: localised regional nature stations, not accessible out of the country.

Festivals and cultural events

Theatre 
 The MASA Festival.

Dance 
 Urban Dance Festival.
 Hip-hop is back. The show was on 21 April 2007, and Diam's and Rageman were guests. It took place on two stages at the Las Palmas complex.

Fashion 
Several fashion events are organised in the city each year: "Les Féeries" (The Fairies), the ceremonies for Miss Côte d'Ivoire, Miss Abidjan District, Miss Christmas (for 6- to 11-year-olds) and Miss Awoulaba (very prestigious). Moreover, the Yéhé Fashion Show takes place every year, a celebration of African fashion, and the International Festival of Lingerie and Beauty of Abidjan (FILBA).

Abidjan is also the headquarters for Ivory Coast's clothes designers, renowned for being the best in Africa; including Gilles Touré (designer for Miss Côte d'Ivoire) or even Pathéo.

Other 
 Climbie Beach Festival
 International Cartoon Festival,.
 International Comedy Festival (FIRA) organised by Adama Dahico.

Places of worship 

Among the places of worship, they are predominantly Christian churches and temples : Roman Catholic Archdiocese of Abidjan (Catholic Church), United Methodist Church Ivory Coast (World Methodist Council), Union of Missionary Baptist Churches in Ivory Coast (Baptist World Alliance), Assemblies of God. There are also Muslim mosques. The Church of Jesus Christ of Latter-day Saints has over 100 congregations in the area with a temple announced for Abidjan in 2015 and construction starting in 2018.

Sport 
Côte d'Ivoire is home to teams from several sports: (basketball, athletics, rugby, handball, volleyball, etc.), soccer is very popular in Abidjan. Abidjan is home to ASEC Mimosas, one of the country's leading football clubs.

Football 

 Ivorian Football Federation
 Professional Clubs

 Each year a 7-a-side football tournament is organised: the Festival of Maracana d'Abidjan (FESTMA) which takes place in Yopougon.
 Following the undeniable success of the "Football Academy" created by Jean-Marc Guillou (Académie Sol Béni), from which several old members have rejoined professional European clubs, several football training centres for young footballers have developed in recent years: the Cyril Domoraud Centre, Labo foot in Yopougon, the Centre ivoirien de formation de football d'Abidjan (CIFFA), l'Étoile Scientifique Football Abidjan (ESFA), etc.

Events:

In 1964, the Jeux d'Abidjan took place in Abidjan, as did the final of the African Cup Winners' Cup in 1975, 1980, 1983, and 1990, then another in 1992 under the name of CAF Confederations Cup. The Stade Félix Houphouët-Boigny was the host of the very first African Super Cup in 1992, and the second in 1998. The finals of the 1966, 1986, 1995, and 1998 CAF Champions League also took place in Abidjan.

The main football event organised in Abidjan was the 1984 African Cup of Nations and one of the finals of the 1983 African Youth Cup of Nations.

The economic capital also attracted other football events such as the Assumption Tournament (the first one taking place in 2007 in the Stade Robert Champroux), the West African Club Championship (UFOA Cup), and international gala matches.

Other sports 
Basketball

 Côte d'Ivoire Basketball Federation
 Clubs : Abidjan Basket Club, Club sportif Abidjanais, ASEC Mimosas, Phénix Basket Club de Cocody and Génération Basket-ball Club (GBC) which is a new club of young volunteers who want to become basketball players.

Rugby
 Côte d'IvoireRugby Federation
 Clubs : Abidjan University Club, Treichville Biafra Olympic

Abidjan is the centre of Ivorian rugby, and most of the Côte d'Ivoiret national rugby union team come from here. Although the origins of Ivorian rugby go back to the 1960s and earlier, French official Jean-François Turon managed the team at Abidjan University in the 1980s, but it was François Dali who created Ivorian rugby, and his son was the national captain during the 1990s.

Cycling

 Côte d'Ivoire Cycling Federation
 Clubs : ASFA Moossou, Club cycliste d'Azagui, AS Cavel de Koumassi, Cycliste club de l'océan, and the Club cycliste de Yopougon

Tennis

 Côte d'Ivoire Tennis which organised the first International Tennis tournament CEDEAO in 2007
 Clubs : Seamen's Club, SGBCI Tennis Club, Tennis Club Hotel Ivoire, Sporting Club 2 Plateaux, Palm Club Abidjan Tennis, and the Lycée technique Abidjan Tennis Club

Judo

 Côte d'Ivoire Federation of Judo and Related Disciplines which organised the 15th Abidjan Tournament in 2007'.

Athletics

 Côte d'Ivoire Athletics Federation.
 Clubs : Club d'Attécoubé and Club de Yopougon

Boxing

 Club : SOA Boxing Club d'Abidjan

Golf

 Côte d'Ivoire Golf Federation
 Club: Ivoire Golf Club

Facilities 
 Stadiums : Stade INJS, Stade Municipal d'Abidjan, Stade Municipal de Man FC, Stade Félix Houphouët-Boigny, Parc des Sports de Treichville, Stade Robert Champroux, Stade du Port autonome d'Abidjan.
 Other facilities: Omnisport Palace in Treichville
 Olympic Complex: with 80,000 to 100,000 seats is being planned, thanks to the Ivorian managers' desire to provide the "Elephants" with a better national stadium. The complex will have, in addition to areas for all different Olympic disciplines (football, athletics, swimming, etc.), restaurants, shops, auditoriums, conference rooms, a hotel for the sportspeople, and training areas. Since the sudden increase in Ivorian football, the government believes that the national team deserves a better stadium. Although, there was a problem with the "Félicia": it is impossible to increase its size due to its location in Le Plateau. The project for the new complex was suspended  because of a lack of investors and the political situation which the country has been experiencing since December 1999.

Notes

References

Bibliography

External links 

Site officiel du District d'Abidjan
TEDxAbidjan, The Premier Intellectual Gathering of Côte d'Ivoire – Le Principal Forum Intellectuel qui réunit les esprits les plus brillants sous licence de TED

 
Districts of Ivory Coast
Port cities and towns of the Atlantic Ocean
Port cities in Africa
Former national capitals
Populated places in Abidjan